Mount Low is a suburb of Townsville  in the City of Townsville, Queensland, Australia.

Geography
The Bruce Highway and the Great Northern Railway form the southern boundary of the suburb. Deeragun railway station serves the suburb.

History
On 28 February 2003, it was officially made a suburb.

In 2008,  the Maidment Development Group had a residential development for 1300 houses approved.

Education 
There are no schools in Mount Low. The nearest government primary schools are Bohlevale State School and North Shore State School, both  in neighbouring Burdell to the east. The nearest government secondary school is Northern Beaches State High School in neighbouring Deeragun to the south.

Amenities 
There are a number of parks in the area.

Kilcora Park in Kilcora Street has a half basketball court.

Sanctum Park on Sanctum Boulevard has outdoor exercise equipment, playground equipment and a dog park.

References

External links 
 

Suburbs of Townsville